Wheelchair basketball at the 2020 Summer Paralympics was held at two venues: Musashino Forest Sport Plaza for group stage rounds and Ariake Arena for group stage and finals.

The 2020 Summer Olympic and Paralympic Games were postponed to 2021 due to the COVID-19 pandemic. They kept the 2020 name and were held from 24 August to 5 September 2021.

Qualifying
There are 12 qualified men's teams and 10 qualified women's teams.

Men

Women

Competition schedule

Medalists

See also
Basketball at the 2020 Summer Olympics

References

External links
Results book 

2020 Summer Paralympics events
2020
International basketball competitions hosted by Japan
Paralympics